In formal logic, nonfirstorderizability is the inability of a natural-language statement to be adequately captured by a formula of first-order logic.  Specifically, a statement is nonfirstorderizable if there is no formula of first-order logic which is true in a model if and only if the statement holds in that model. Nonfirstorderizable statements are sometimes presented as evidence that first-order logic is not adequate to capture the nuances of meaning in natural language.

The term was coined by George Boolos in his paper "To Be is to Be a Value of a Variable (or to Be Some Values of Some Variables)".
Quine argued that such sentences call for second-order symbolization, which can be interpreted as plural quantification over the same domain as first-order quantifiers use, without postulation of distinct "second-order objects" (properties, sets, etc.).

Examples

Geach-Kaplan sentence 
A standard example is the Geach–Kaplan sentence: "Some critics admire only one another."
If Axy is understood to mean "x admires y," and the universe of discourse is the set of all critics, then a reasonable translation of the sentence into second order logic is:

That this formula has no first-order equivalent can be seen by turning it into a formula in the language of arithmetic .  Substitute the formula (y = x + 1 v x = y + 1) for Axy.  The result,

states that there is a set  with these properties:
 There are at least two numbers in 
A model of a formal theory of arithmetic, such as first-order Peano arithmetic, is called standard if it only contains the familiar natural numbers  as elements. The model is called non-standard otherwise. Therefore, the formula given above is true only in non-standard models, because, in the standard model, the set  must contain all available numbers . In addition, there is a set  satisfying the formula in every non-standard model.

Let us assume that there is a first-order rendering of the above formula called . If  were added to the Peano axioms, it would mean that there were no non-standard models of the augmented axioms. However, the usual argument for the existence of non-standard models would still go through, proving that there are non-standard models after all. This is a contradiction, so we can conclude that no such formula  exists in first-order logic.

Finiteness of the domain 
There is no formula  in first-order logic with equality which is true of all and only models with finite domains. In other words, there is no first-order formula which can express "there is only a finite number of things".

This is implied by the compactness theorem as follows. Suppose there is a formula  which is true in all and only models with finite domains. We can express, for any positive integer , the sentence "there are at least  elements in the domain". For a given , call the formula expressing that there are at least  elements . For example, the formula  is:

which expresses that there are at least three distinct elements in the domain. Consider the infinite set of formulae

Every finite subset of these formulae has a model: given a subset, find the greatest  for which the formula  is in the subset. Then a model with a domain containing  elements will satisfy  (because the domain is finite) and all the  formulae in the subset. Applying the compactness theorem, the entire infinite set must also have a model. However, this model cannot be finite, because if the model has only  elements, it does not satisfy the formula . This contradiction shows that there can be no formula  with the property we assumed.

Other examples 
 The concept of identity cannot be defined in first-order languages, merely indiscernibility.
 The Archimedean property that may be used to identify the real numbers among the real closed fields.
 The compactness theorem implies that graph connectivity cannot be expressed in first-order logic.

See also 
 Definable set
 Branching quantifier
 Generalized quantifier
 Plural quantification
 Reification (linguistics)

References

External links 
 Printer-friendly CSS, and nonfirstorderisability by Terence Tao

Logic